Mandangala is a medium-sized Aboriginal community, located in the Kimberley region of Western Australia, within the Shire of Wyndham-East Kimberley. The local Aboriginal languages of the community are Miriwoong and Kija; most people in the community speak those languages.

Governance 
The community is managed through its incorporated body, Mandangala Aboriginal Corporation, incorporated under the Aboriginal Councils and Associations Act 1976 on 10 September 1986.

Town planning 
Mandangala Layout Plan No.1 has been prepared in accordance with State Planning Policy 3.2 Aboriginal Settlements. Layout Plan No.1 was endorsed by the Western Australian Planning Commission on 1 June 2001.

References

External links
 Office of the Registrar of Indigenous Corporations

Towns in Western Australia
Aboriginal communities in Kimberley (Western Australia)